Ekstremfjorden is a fjord at the northern coast of Nordaustlandet, Svalbard, east of Laponiahalvøya. It mouths into the western part of Nordenskiöldbukta.

References

Fjords of Svalbard
Nordaustlandet